The Poynter Building, on Main St. in London, Kentucky, was built in 1910.  It was listed on the National Register of Historic Places in 1985.

It is a two-story common bond brick commercial building placed prominently on a corner in downtown London.  It held the first drugstore in London.  It was deemed "significant as the best example of turn of the century commercial architecture in London and because of its association with the development of significant modern commercial and communication facilities in London."

References

Commercial buildings on the National Register of Historic Places in Kentucky
Commercial buildings completed in 1910
National Register of Historic Places in Laurel County, Kentucky
1910 establishments in Kentucky
London, Kentucky